William Hiatt may refer to:
William R. Hiatt (1950–2020), American cardiologist
William S. Hiatt, American politician from North Carolina